Here are the match results of the 2015 Rugby union season.
The main tournament for the year was the 2015 Rugby World Cup which was held at England this year.

International tournaments

Worldwide
 October 17, 2014 – May 2, 2015: 2014–15 European Rugby Champions Cup 
 February 6 – March 21: 2015 Six Nations Championship
 February 12 – July 4: 2015 Super Rugby season
 March 9 – 23: 2015 World Rugby Pacific Challenge
 May 12 – 24: 2015 World Rugby Under 20 Trophy in Portugal
 June 2 – 20: 2015 World Rugby Under 20 Championship in Italy
 July 17 – August 8: 2015 Rugby Championship
 July 18 – August 3: 2015 World Rugby Pacific Nations Cup
 September 18 – October 31: 2015 Rugby World Cup in England

Rugby sevens 
 October 11, 2014 – May 17, 2015: 2014–15 Sevens World Series
 Cup winner: 
 Plate winner: 
 Bowl winner: 
 Shield winner: 
 Cup winner: 
 Plate winner: 
 Bowl winner: 
 Shield winner: 
 December 13 & 14, 2014: 2014 South Africa Sevens, in  Port Elizabeth, at the Nelson Mandela Bay Stadium
 Cup winner: 
 Plate winner: 
 Bowl winner: 
 Shield winner: 
 Cup winner: 
 Plate winner: 
 Bowl winner: 
 Shield winner: 
 February 13 – 15, 2015: 2015 USA Sevens, in  Whitney, Nevada, at the Sam Boyd Stadium
 Cup winner: 
 Plate winner: 
 Bowl winner: 
 Shield winner: 
 March 27 – 29, 2015: 2015 Hong Kong Sevens at the Hong Kong Stadium
 Cup winner: 
 Plate winner: 
 Bowl winner: 
 Shield winner: 
 World Series Qualifier winner: 
 April 4 & 5, 2015: 2015 Japan Sevens, in  Tokyo, at the Chichibunomiya Rugby Stadium
 Cup winner: 
 Plate winner: 
 Bowl winner: 
 Shield winner: 
 May 9 & 10, 2015: 2015 Scotland Sevens, in  Glasgow, at the Scotstoun Stadium
 Cup winner: 
 Plate winner: 
 Bowl winner: 
 Shield winner: 
 Cup winner: 
 Plate winner: 
 Bowl winner: 
 Shield winner: 
 December 4, 2014 – May 23, 2015: 2014–15 World Rugby Women's Sevens Series
 Cup winner: 
 Plate winner: 
 Bowl winner: 
 Cup winner: 
 Plate winner: 
 Bowl winner: 
 March 14 & 15, 2015: 2015 USA Women's Sevens, in  Kennesaw, Georgia, at the Fifth Third Bank Stadium
 Cup winner: 
 Plate winner: 
 Bowl winner: 
 April 18 & 19, 2015: 2015 Canada Women's Sevens, in  Langford, British Columbia, at the Westhills Stadium (debut event)
 Cup winner: 
 Plate winner: 
 Bowl winner: 
 Cup winner: 
 Plate winner: 
 Bowl winner: 
 May 22 & 23, 2015: 2015 Netherlands Women's Sevens (final) at the NRCA Stadium
 Cup winner: 
 Plate winner: 
 Bowl winner: 

News

See also
2015 in sports

References

 
Years of the 21st century in rugby union